Worsham is a surname. Notable people with the surname include: 

Charlie Worsham (born 1985), American country music singer and songwriter
Del Worsham (born 1970), American NHRA Funny car driver
Lauren Worsham (born 1982), American actress and singer
Lew Worsham (1917-1990), American golfer